Hubert Tinge Meta (born 16 July 1964) is a Papua New Guinean former boxer. He competed in the men's light welterweight event at the 1992 Summer Olympics.

References

External links
 

1964 births
Living people
Papua New Guinean male boxers
Olympic boxers of Papua New Guinea
Boxers at the 1992 Summer Olympics
Place of birth missing (living people)
Light-welterweight boxers